No Safety Ahead is a 1959 British film.

Plot summary
An office clerk unwittingly joins a gang.

Cast
James Kenney as Clem
Susan Beaumont as Jean
Denis Shaw as Inspector
Gordon Needham as Richardson
Tony Doonan as Don
John Charlesworth as Jeff
Brian Weske as Bill
Robert Raglan as Langton
Mark Singleton as Fordham
Hal Osmond (uncredited)

References

External links

1959 films
British crime drama films
1950s English-language films
1950s British films